Sir Willoughby Hickman, 3rd Baronet (1659–1720) of Gainsborough Old Hall, Lincolnshire was a British landowner and politician who sat in the English House of Commons between 1685 and 1706 and in the British House of Commons from 1713 to 1720.

Early life
Hickman was born on 20 August 1659, the third, but eldest surviving son  of Sir William Hickman, 2nd Baronet of Gainsborough, Lincolnshire and his wife Elizabeth Neville, daughter of John Nevile of Mattersey Priory, Nottinghamshire. His father died in February 1682 and he succeeded to the estates and baronetcy. He married Anne Anderson, daughter of Sir Stephen Anderson, 1st Baronet, of Eyworth, Bedfordshire on 11 September 1683.

Political career
Hickman was Steward of Kirton manor, Lincolnshire from 1682 to 1689. He was Deputy Lieutenant for Nottinghamshire and Lincolnshire from 1682. At the 1685 general election he was elected Member of Parliament for Kingston upon Hull and sat for two years. He did not stand again for Parliament for over ten years. He was Justice of the Peace for Nottinghamshire and Lindsey Lincolnshire from 1698 and was Commissioner for assessment for Lincolnshire in 1689 and 1690. 

At the 1698 general election Hickman was returned unopposed as Tory MP for East Retford on his own interest which derived from the estate of Mattersey, which he inherited from his mother. Thereafter Hickman faced a contest at each election at East Retford and the result was each time overturned on petition. At the first general election of 1701 he was defeated in the poll but was seated on petition on 15 April 1701. At the second general election of 1701 he was again defeated in the poll, but this time his petition was unsuccessful. At the 1702 general election he was again defeated in the poll and returned on petition on 28 November 1702. He topped the poll at the 1705 general election, but was this time he was unseated on petition on 17 January 1706. Hickman abandoned East Retford, but at the 1710 general election returned his son Willoughby there who suffered the same experience, being returned only on petition.

Hickman  was returned as MP for Lincolnshire unopposed at a by-election on 9 September 1713  At the 1715 general election, he was returned for Lincolnshire unopposed and sat until his death in 1720.

Death and legacy
Hickman died on 28 October 1720. He and his wife Anne had six daughters and five sons of whom two survived. He was succeeded in the baronetcy by his son Neville.

His daughter Elizabeth, b. 1693, married Henry Eyre of Row Tor, Derbyshire (bpt  22.09.1693) and their daughter, Anne, b. c 1717-22.05.1805, married Clotworthy Skeffington, 1st Earl of Massereene on 25 Nov 1741.

References

1659 births
1720 deaths
British MPs 1708–1710
British MPs 1710–1713
British MPs 1713–1715
British MPs 1715–1722
British MPs 1722–1727
British MPs 1727–1734
Members of the Parliament of Great Britain for English constituencies
Baronets in the Baronetage of England